Salar is a Turkic language spoken by the Salar people, who mainly live in the provinces of Qinghai and Gansu in China; some also live in Ili, Xinjiang. It is a primary branch and an eastern outlier of the Oghuz branch of Turkic, the other Oghuz languages (Turkish, Azerbaijani, Turkmen) being spoken mostly in Western and Central Asia. The Salar number about 105,000 people, about 70,000 (2002) speak the Salar language; under 20,000 monolinguals.

According to Salar tradition and Chinese chronicles, the Salars are the descendants of the Salur tribe, belonging to the Oghuz Turk tribe of the Western Turkic Khaganate. During the Tang dynasty, the Salur tribe dwelt within China's borders and lived since then in the Qinghai-Gansu border region. Contemporary Salar has some influence from Chinese and Amdo Tibetan.

Classification 
Due to the ethnonym "Salur", which is also shared by some modern Turkmen tribes, linguists historically tried to establish a link between Turkmen varieties and Salar language. Most modern linguists today classify Salar as an independent primary branch of Oghuz languages.

History

Origins and development 
Ancestor of the modern Salar language is thought to be the first language that diverged from the Proto-Oghuz language, a hypothetical language that all modern Oghuz languages believed to be descended from. It is brought to the region by a small, nomadic and Muslim community, and received significant influence from other non-Oghuz Turkic languages such as Chagatai, Kipchak and Karluk languages, along with non-Turkic languages belonging to the Sino-Tibetan family.

After the Jahriyya revolt, some Salars were deported to Ili valley and established a new community in the region. This led to the divergence of a distinctive dialect called Ili Salar influenced by the neighboring Kazakh and Uyghur languages.

Current situation 
According to 2002 estimates Salars number about 105,000 people, and about 70,000 of them speak the Salar language. Only under 20,000 Salars are monolingual.

The Salar language is the official language in all Salar autonomous areas. Such autonomous areas are the Xunhua Salar Autonomous County and the Jishishan Bonan, Dongxiang and Salar Autonomous County. In Qinghai Province, most Salar people speak both Qinghai Mandarin (Chinese) and Salar. Rural Salars can speak Salar more fluently while urban Salars often assimilate more into the Chinese-speaking Hui Muslim population.

Phonology
Salar phonology has been influenced by Chinese and Tibetan. In addition,  and  have become separate phonemes due to loanwords, as it has in other Turkic languages.

Salar vowels are as in Turkish, with the back vowels  and the corresponding front vowels . In Ili Salar, the i and y high front vowels, when placed after an initial glides are spirantized with j transforming into ʝ. Qinghai and Ili Salar have mostly the same consonantal development.

Vocabulary
In Qinghai Province, the Salar language has a notable influence from Chinese and Tibetan. Although of Turkic origin, major linguistic structures have been absorbed from Chinese. Around 20% of the vocabulary is of Chinese origin and 10% is also of Tibetan origin. Yet the official Communist Chinese government policy deliberately covers up these influences in academic and linguistics studies, trying to emphasize the Turkic element and completely ignoring the Chinese in the Salar language. The Salar language has taken loans and influence from neighboring varieties of Chinese. Vice versa, the neighboring variants of the Chinese language have also adopted loan words from the Salar language.

For the verb "to do" Salar uses "ät" (compare Turkish et).  For the word "lips" Salar uses "dodax" (compare Turkish dudak). The participle miš is used by Salar (compare Turkish -mış).

Dialects
The Qing Empire deported some Salars who belonged to the Jahriyya Sufi order to the Ili valley which is in modern-day Xinjiang. Today, a community of about four thousand Salars speaking a distinct dialect of Salar still live in Ili. Salar migrants from Amdo (Qinghai) came to settle the region as religious exiles, migrants, and as soldiers enlisted in the Chinese army to fight rebels in Ili, often following the Hui. The distinctive dialect of the Ili Salar differs from the other Salar dialects because the neighboring Kazakh and Uyghur languages in Ili influenced it. The Ili Salar population numbers around 4,000 people. There have been instances of misunderstanding between speakers of Ili Salar and Qinghai Salar due to the divergence of the dialects. The differences between the two dialect result in a "clear isogloss".

However, Lin Lianyun and Han Jianye divide the Salar into two dialects by including the Western Salar in the Gaizi dialect: the Gaizi dialect and the Mengda dialect. The Gaizi dialect is mainly distributed in Jiezi, Qingshui and Baizhuang in Xunhua County, Gandu in Hualong County, Dahejia in Linxia Hui Autonomous Prefecture of Gansu Province and Yining County, Xinjiang Uygur Autonomous Region. The Mengda dialect is distributed in the Mengda area of Xunhua County. The Mengda dialect is b-Salar, while the Gaizi (or Jiezi) dialect is v-Salar. For example; It lives in the Ili and Jiezi as vol- "to be", ver- "to give", vax- "to look", and in the Mengda dialect as bol- "to be", ber- "to give", bax- "to look". Also, Mengda lost its gh phoneme and the phonemes turn into x phonemes: Gaizi deɣ- "to touch", Mengda dex- "to touch"; Gaizi yaʁ- "to rain", Mengda yaχ- "to rain". While the m phonemes stood in the Gaizi dialect, it turned to the n sound in Mengda dialect: Gaizi qamjü "whip", Mengda qanjü "whip"; Gaizi göm- "to embed", Mengda gön- "to embed".

Although Ili Salar is far from other speakers, the dialects of the Salar language are very close to each other. The difference between them is mostly phonological. For example; Ili Salar gölök, Qinghai gölix, gölex "cow".

Writing system
Salars mostly use Chinese for written purposes while using Salar language for spoken purposes.

Salar hasn't had an official script, but it has sometimes been written down using the Arabic script. Some Salar call for a Latin script and some Salar who dislike the Pinyin-based Latin script desire to use Chinese characters instead. This lack of an official script has led most Salar to use the Chinese writing system. China offered the Salar an official writing system quite similar to the Uyghur Yengi Yezik, but it was rejected for similar reasons as Yengi Yezik was rejected in Xinjiang.

Young Salar have also started to use a Salar script based on the orthography for Turkic languages. It is quite popular with Salars for writing Salar on the internet. There are two main variants that are used, TB30 and TB31. Arabic script is also still popular among the Salar. The Arabic script has historical precedent among the Salar; centuries-old documents in the Salar language were written in the Arabic script when discovered.

Grigory Potanin used the Cyrillic alphabet to record a glossary of Salar, Western Yugur language and Eastern Yugur language in his 1893 Russian language book The Tangut-Tibetan Borderlands of China and Central Mongolia with assistance from Vasily Radlov.

William Woodville Rockhill wrote a glossary of Salar in his 1894 book Diary of a Journey through Mongolia and Tibet in 1891 and 1892 using the Latin alphabet based on the Wade–Giles romanization system used for Chinese.

TB30
Aa Bb Cc Çç Dd Ee Ff Gg
Ğğ Hh İi Iı Kk Ll Mm Nn Ññ 
Oo Öö Pp Qq Rr Ss Şş Tt 
Uu Üü Yy Vv Zz

Pinyin-based Latin alphabet
A romanization of the Mengda dialect of Salar based on Pinyin has been developed, created by a Salar, Ma Quanlin, who lives in Xunhua. Like Pinyin, which is used to romanize Mandarin Chinese, this Salar romanization is divided into categories of consonants and vowels. Letters that occur both in Pinyin and romanization of Mengda Salar share the same sound values.

consonants

Vowels

Sample text 
Here is given an excerpt of the "kiš yiγen ġadïn kiš" ("people-eating woman") story from Ma Wei, Ma Jianzhong & Kevin Stuart's work The Folklore of China's Islamic Salar Nationality.

Notes

Sources
 Hahn, R. F. 1988. Notes on the Origin and Development of the Salar Language, Acta Orientalia Hungarica XLII (2–3), 235–237.
 Dwyer, A. 1996. Salar Phonology. Unpublished dissertation University of Washington.
 Dwyer, A. M. 1998. The Turkic strata of Salar: An Oghuz in Chaghatay clothes? Turkic Languages 2, 49–83.

References

External links

 Abstract of Article on Salar, includes some phrases (The Salar is written in Chinese Pinyin, not the Salar alphabet)
 Remarks on the Salar Language
 Salar grammatical sketch (still a rough draft)
 Salar Language Materials

Agglutinative languages
Oghuz languages
Languages of China
Salar people
Turkic languages